Kim Sang-ho (born July 24, 1970) is a South Korean actor. He appears in film, television and theater. Kim won Best Supporting Actor at the 2007 Blue Dragon Film Awards for his performance in The Happy Life.

Filmography

Film

Television series

Web series

Variety show

Theater

Awards and nominations

References

External links
Kim Sang-ho at Huayi Brothers 

20th-century South Korean male actors
South Korean male film actors
South Korean male television actors
South Korean male stage actors
1970 births
Living people
21st-century South Korean male actors